Salehan may refer to:
 Salehan, Kohgiluyeh and Boyer-Ahmad
 Salehan, Mazandaran
 Salehan Rural District, in Markazi Province